Fernow Hall is an early twentieth century Cornell University building, that was listed on the National Register of Historic Places in 1984. It currently houses the Department of Natural Resources. It is named in honor of Bernhard Fernow, who was the only Dean during the five-year history of the New York State College of Forestry at Cornell.  It was designed by Green & Wicks in the Colonial Revival style and constructed in 1915.

References

Cornell University buildings
New York State College of Forestry
University and college buildings on the National Register of Historic Places in New York (state)
National Register of Historic Places in Tompkins County, New York
1912 establishments in New York (state)
Green & Wicks buildings